Makenzie Weale (born 26 June 2002) is an Australian professional rugby league footballer who currently plays for the Newcastle Knights in the NRL Women's Premiership.

Background
Born in Brisbane, Queensland, Weale played her junior rugby league for the West Arana Panthers, also spending time with Wests Mitchelton.

Playing career

Early years
In October 2018, Weale was named in the 2019 Queensland Academy of Sport under-18s squad. In 2019, she played for the University of Queensland rugby sevens side and travelled with Tribe 7's rugby team to Hong Kong to compete at the All Girls International Rugby Sevens tournament where the team were undefeated throughout the competition and won the tournament. In 2020, she joined the West Brisbane Panthers in the QRL Women's Premiership. In 2021, she played for the Queensland women's under-19s rugby league team.

2022
On 19 July, Weale signed a contract with QRL Women's Premiership side Norths Devils, to join them in 2023. On 21 July, she signed with the Newcastle Knights in the NRL Women's Premiership for the 2022 season. In round 2 of the 2022 NRLW season, she made her NRLW debut for the Knights against the Gold Coast Titans.

References

External links
Newcastle Knights profile

2002 births
Australian rugby league players
Newcastle Knights (NRLW) players
Rugby league second-rows
Rugby league centres
Rugby league players from Brisbane
Living people